Carolyn Mountford is an Australian researcher who specializes in magnetic resonance spectroscopic imaging. Mountford currently holds five significant patents regarding magnetic resonance spectroscopy and is the current CEO at the Translational Research Institute (Australia).

Biography 
Mountford is a specialist in magnetic resonance spectroscopy (MRS). Her team has been a worldwide development site for Siemens since 1999. This work has resulted in techniques and therapies used by research centres and hospitals for patients with cancer, brain tumors, and neurologic and psychological disorders.   
She is currently working with the United States and Australian military on a new in vivo MR approach that can detect changes to brain chemistry and may lead to new therapies for brain injury and post-traumatic stress disorder.

To date, Mountford has secured approximately $39 million in funding grants. She is the author or co-author of more than 180 peer-review articles and the holder of five significant patents in the areas of cancer, chronic pain, head injury and MR, with a further five patents in the pipeline.

Mountford is currently the CEO and Director of Research for the Translational Research Institute (Australia). Since 2006 Mountford has been the Director for Clinical Spectroscopy at the Brigham and Women’s Hospital in Boston, Massachusetts and since 2007 has been a Professor in Radiology at Harvard Medical School in Boston, Massachusetts. From 2011 until early 2015, Mounford was the Director for the Centre for MR in Health and Professor in Radiology at Newcastle University, Newcastle, New South Wales, where she was instrumental in securing the MRI scanning center.

Research 
She led the multidisciplinary team who developed a new MRS technique known as localised correlated spectroscopy (L-COSY).  The scanning technology detects a series of changes in breast tissue, which could provide early warning signs for women with BRCA 1 and BRCA 2. These changes appear to represent a series of early warning signs that may allow women to make informed decisions as to when or if they have a mastectomy.

References

Living people
Australian medical researchers
Year of birth missing (living people)